Wyczółki may refer to the following places:
Wyczółki, Lublin Voivodeship (east Poland)
Wyczółki, Grodzisk Mazowiecki County in Masovian Voivodeship (east-central Poland)
Wyczółki, Podlaskie Voivodeship (north-east Poland)
Wyczółki, Łosice County in Masovian Voivodeship (east-central Poland)
Wyczółki, Siedlce County in Masovian Voivodeship (east-central Poland)
Wyczółki, Sochaczew County in Masovian Voivodeship (east-central Poland)
Wyczółki, Węgrów County in Masovian Voivodeship (east-central Poland)